Abadi Emamzadeh Esmail (also Romanized as Ābādī Emāmzādeh Esmā‘īl; also known as Emāmzādeh Shāhzādeh Esmā‘īl, Emāmzādeh Esmā‘īl, Shāhzādeh Esmā‘īl, and Shāhzādeh Ismā‘īl) is a village in Fordu Rural District, Kahak District, Qom County, Qom Province, Iran. At the 2006 census, its population was 40, in 13 families.

References 

Populated places in Qom Province